WCML may refer to:

 WCML (TV), a television station (channel 24, virtual 6) licensed to serve Alpena, Michigan, United States
 WCML-FM, a radio station (91.7 FM) licensed to serve Alpena, Michigan
 West Coast Main Line, one of the most important railway corridors in the United Kingdom
 Women's Caucus for the Modern Languages, an allied organization of the Modern Language Association
 Working Class Movement Library, a collection of English-language material relating institutions of the working class